The British TV sitcom series 'Allo 'Allo! pilot was originally broadcast on 30 December 1982. It was repeated as the first of a series of eight episodes broadcast from 7 September to 26 October 1984.

The following episode names are the ones found on the British R2 DVDs with alternative region titles given below them.

Cast

Episodes

References

External links
 Comedy Guide

1984 British television seasons
 1
'Allo 'Allo! seasons